The jibarito, is a sandwich made with flattened, fried green plantains instead of bread, aioli or garlic-flavored mayonnaise, and a filling that typically includes meat, cheese, lettuce and tomato.  The original jibarito had a steak filling, and that remains the usual variety, but other ingredients, such as chicken and pork, are common.

History
Chicago restaurateur Juan "Peter" Figueroa introduced the jibarito at Borinquen Restaurant, a Puerto Rican restaurant in the Humboldt Park neighborhood, in 1996, after reading about a Puerto Rican sandwich created in Plátano Loco in 1991 substituting plantains for bread. The name is a diminutive of Jíbaro and means "little yokel".

The sandwich's popularity soon spread to other Latin-American restaurants around Chicago, including Mexican, Cuban and Argentinian establishments, and jibaritos now can be found in some mainstream eateries as well.

Related sandwiches
Other Latin American sandwiches served on fried plantains predate the jibarito. They include a Venezuelan cuisine specialty called a patacones and a 1991 invention by Jorge Muñoz and Coquí Feliciano served at their restaurant, Plátano Loco, in Aguada, Puerto Rico.

Reception 
The Daily Meal included the jibarito in their article "12 Life-Changing Sandwiches You've Never Heard Of".

See also
Culture of Chicago
 Culture of Puerto Rico
 List of sandwiches
 Patacon (food)

References

Puerto Rican cuisine
Cuisine of Chicago
Latin American cuisine
Cheese sandwiches
Culture of Chicago
Food and drink introduced in 1996
Plantain dishes